Bemis is an unincorporated community in Deuel County in the northeast corner of the U.S. state of South Dakota.

A post office called Bemis was established in 1905, and remained in operation until 1985. The community has the name of P. W. Bemis, a first settler.

References

Unincorporated communities in Deuel County, South Dakota
Unincorporated communities in South Dakota